During the 1974–75 English football season, Brentford competed in the Football League Fourth Division. After a poor first half of the season, manager Mike Everitt was sacked and replaced by John Docherty, who produced a strong run of results to finish the campaign in 8th place.

Season summary 
Off the back of Brentford's lowest finish in the Football League since the 1925–26 season, only three players were signed – defender Keith Lawrence on a permanent deal from Chelsea, goalkeeper Steve Sherwood on a season-long loan from Chelsea and Wimbledon midfield trialist Graham Smith. Two long-serving players were released, winger John Docherty and full back Alan Hawley. New chairman Les Davey announced that the club would move to a new stadium in West London and that there was talk of a £1,000,000 takeover bid by local firm Brentford Nylons, but nothing came of either plan.

Brentford began the season poorly and after eight league matches were just two points above the Fourth Division re-election zone, though one early season highlight was a League Cup second round tie versus First Division giants Liverpool at Anfield, where Roger Cross scored the opener in a 2–1 defeat. The Liverpool match was also notable for it being the final appearance made by centre half Peter Gelson, then the club's second-highest appearance-maker, who had his contract cancelled and departed the club shortly afterwards. Under recently appointed chairman Dan Tana, manager Mike Everitt was given a vote of confidence in November 1974 and strengthened the team by signing forward Willie Brown on loan from Newport County (and later permanently for £4,000) and midfielder Terry Johnson from Southend United for £15,000.

The signings had the desired effect and Brentford rose into mid-table after winning four and drawing one of a seven-match spell from late November through to mid-January 1975, but on 16 January, manager Mike Everitt was sacked. Trainer Jess Willard took over as caretaker manager for the following match, before the appointment of former player John Docherty on 20 January. Docherty turned Brentford's season around, losing just four of the remaining 19 matches of the season to finish in 8th place. Four wins, two draws and just one defeat in April won Docherty the Football League Manager of the Month award.

League table

Results
Brentford's goal tally listed first.

Legend

Pre-season and friendlies

Football League Fourth Division

FA Cup

Football League Cup 

 Sources: 100 Years of Brentford, The Big Brentford Book of the Seventies,Croxford, Lane & Waterman, p. 306. Statto

Playing squad 
Players' ages are as of the opening day of the 1974–75 season.

 Sources: The Big Brentford Book of the Seventies, Timeless Bees

Coaching staff

Mike Everitt (17 August 1974 – 16 January 1975)

Jess Willard (16 – 20 January 1975)

John Docherty (20 January – 26 April 1975)

Statistics

Appearances and goals
Substitute appearances in brackets.

Players listed in italics left the club mid-season.
Source: 100 Years of Brentford

Goalscorers 

Players listed in italics left the club mid-season.
Source: 100 Years of Brentford

Management

Summary

Transfers & loans

Awards 
 Supporters' Player of the Year: Steve Sherwood
 Players' Player of the Year: Jackie Graham
 Football League Manager of the Month: John Docherty (April 1975)

Notes

References 

Brentford F.C. seasons
Brentford